Zalegoshch is an urban locality (an urban-type settlement) and the administrative center of Zalegoshchensky District of Oryol Oblast, Russia, located on the Neruch River,  east of Oryol. Population:

References

Urban-type settlements in Oryol Oblast